In mathematics, a number of concepts employ the word harmonic. The similarity of this terminology to that of music is not accidental: the equations of motion of vibrating strings, drums and columns of air are given by formulas involving Laplacians; the solutions to which are given by eigenvalues corresponding to their modes of vibration. Thus, the term "harmonic" is applied when one is considering functions with sinusoidal variations, or solutions of Laplace's equation and related concepts.

Mathematical terms whose names include "harmonic" include:
 Projective harmonic conjugate
 Cross-ratio
 Harmonic analysis
 Harmonic conjugate
 Harmonic form
 Harmonic function
 Harmonic mean
 Harmonic mode
 Harmonic number
 Harmonic series
 Alternating harmonic series
 Harmonic tremor
 Spherical harmonics

Mathematical terminology
Harmonic analysis